Precious is the debut English album by Cubic U (Hikaru Utada's stage name before her debut in Japan), which was recorded at Sony Music Studios in New York in 1996. The album was never released commercially in the US, due to internal problems with the label EMI. It was only available to music industry insiders. The album was released in Japan on January 28, 1998; the album failed to chart on the Oricon weekly charts. After the huge success of Utada's First Love, the album was re-released on March 31, 1999 and peaked at #2 on the Oricon charts with 702,060 copies sold.

Track listing

Note: Several promo copies of the album have the track "Here and There and Back Again" as track 5. This was not released physically.

Release history

Singles

Charts
Precious - Oricon Sales Chart (Japan)

References 

Hikaru Utada albums
1998 debut albums